Walled Lake may refer to:

 Walled Lake, Michigan, a city in Michigan
 Walled Lake Consolidated Schools, a school district with its headquarters in Walled Lake, Michigan
 Walled Lake Central High School
 Walled Lake Northern High School
 Walled Lake Western High School
 Walled Lake (Michigan), a lake near Walled Lake, Michigan

See also 
 Wall Lake (disambiguation)